Finchley Reform Synagogue, a member of the Movement for Reform Judaism, is a synagogue in North Finchley in the London Borough of Barnet. Its clergy are Senior Rabbi Miriam Berger, Cantor Zöe Jacobs, Rabbi Deborah Blausten, Rabbi Howard Cooper and Emeritus Rabbi Jeffrey Newman.

The synagogue is located at 101 Fallow Court Avenue, North Finchley, London N12 0BE. The current building, which seats 220 people, dates from 1974 and replaced an earlier, 1961, synagogue building on the same site.

Notable people
John Bercow, former Speaker of the House of Commons, had his barmitzvah at Finchley Reform Synagogue.
 The synagogue's senior Rabbi, Miriam Berger, is the younger daughter of Rabbi Tony Bayfield, former chief executive and, later, president of the Movement for Reform Judaism.

See also
 List of Jewish communities in the United Kingdom
 List of synagogues in the United Kingdom
 Movement for Reform Judaism

References

External links 

1960 establishments in England
Buildings and structures completed in 1974
Buildings and structures in the London Borough of Barnet
Finchley
Reform synagogues in the United Kingdom
Synagogues in London